This is a list of years in Armenia. See also the timeline of Armenian history.  For only articles about years in Armenia that have been written, see :Category:Years in Armenia.

Twenty-first century

Twentieth century

See also 
 List of years by country

 
Armenia history-related lists
Armenia